Wishes is the second studio album by American country music artist Lari White. Released in June 1994, it contains three singles: "That's My Baby", "Now I Know", and "That's How You Know (When You're in Love)", all of which were Top 10 hits on the Billboard Hot Country Singles & Tracks (now Hot Country Songs) charts.

Content
White wrote "That's My Baby" with her husband, songwriter Chuck Cannon. According to her, the song was climbing the charts when the two were on honeymoon. The album itself received RIAA gold certification in the United States.

Critical reception

Track listing

A Track omitted from cassette version.

Personnel
Richard Bennett – acoustic guitar, requinto
Chuck Cannon – background vocals
Stuart Duncan – fiddle, mandolin
Paul Franklin – steel guitar, Pedabro
Garth Fundis – background vocals
John Gardner – drums
John Hobbs – piano
Hal Ketchum – background vocals on "That's How You Know (When You're in Love)"
Larry Knechtel – piano
Chris Leuzinger – electric guitar
Mark Luna – background vocals
Brent Mason – electric guitar
Steve Nathan – piano, keyboards
Dave Pomeroy – bass guitar
Vince Santoro – drums
Stephony Smith – background vocals
Verlon Thompson – acoustic guitar, background vocals
Billy Joe Walker Jr. – acoustic guitar, gut string guitar
Biff Watson – acoustic guitar
Lari White – lead vocals, background vocals

Charts

Weekly charts

Year-end charts

References

1994 albums
RCA Records albums
Lari White albums
Albums produced by Garth Fundis